Jaime Delgado (born January 11, 1943) is a former Ecuadorian soccer player who played in the NASL.

Career statistics

Club

Notes

References

Living people
Ecuadorian footballers
Ecuadorian expatriate footballers
Association football midfielders
New York Cosmos players
Miami Toros players
North American Soccer League (1968–1984) players
Expatriate soccer players in the United States
Ecuadorian expatriate sportspeople in the United States
1943 births